Christenberry is a surname. Notable people with the surname include:

Herbert William Christenberry (1897–1975), American judge
William Christenberry (1936–2016), American photographer, painter, sculptor, and teacher

See also
Christenberry Fieldhouse